Adams-Edwards House is a historic home located near Raleigh, Wake County, North Carolina.  The original section of the house was built about 1850, and is a single-story, single-pile, side-gabled house with Greek Revival-style design elements. It has a centered front gable, a 3/4-width hip-roofed front porch, and a one-story gabled rear ell.  Additions and alterations were made to the original house about 1860, about 1880, and about 1900.  Also on the property is a contributing well house (c. 1900).

It was listed on the National Register of Historic Places on December 6, 2006.

References

Houses on the National Register of Historic Places in North Carolina
Greek Revival houses in North Carolina
Houses completed in 1850
Houses in Wake County, North Carolina
National Register of Historic Places in Wake County, North Carolina